Karbala is an important neighbourhood and educational institutions area in Kollam (Quilon) city, India. It is situated at the central region of the city. The place is very close to Kollam Junction railway station. Several government offices and colleges are situated at Karbala area.

Major colleges and government institutions in Karbala area
 Kollam Junction railway station
 Fatima Mata National College
 Bishop Jerome Institute
 Sree Narayana Guru College of Legal Studies
 V.N.S.S.College of Nursing
 Income Tax Office
 Village Industries office
 Karbala Trust Hall

See also 
 Chinnakada
 Pattathanam
 Kadappakada

References

Neighbourhoods in Kollam